Gościeradz may refer to the following places:
Gościeradz, Kuyavian-Pomeranian Voivodeship (north-central Poland)
Gościeradz, Kościerzyna County in Pomeranian Voivodeship (north Poland)
Gościeradz, Słupsk County in Pomeranian Voivodeship (north Poland)